Morocco is scheduled to compete at the 2024 Summer Olympics in Paris from 26 July to 11 August 2024. It will be the nation's sixteenth appearance at the Summer Olympics, except for Moscow 1980 as part of the United States-led boycott.

Competitors
The following is the list of number of competitors in the Games.

Athletics

Moroccan track and field athletes achieved the entry standards for Paris 2024, either by passing the direct qualifying mark (or time for track and road races) or by world ranking, in the following events (a maximum of 3 athletes each):

Track and road events

References

2024
Nations at the 2024 Summer Olympics
2024 in Moroccan sport